Terry Lynn Huntingdon (born May 8, 1940) is an American actress who began working in film and television roles after winning the title of Miss USA 1959.

Early years
Huntingdon comes from a family of five-generation Californians. She attended Mt. Shasta High School, where she was a majorette and went from there to the University of California, Los Angeles, where she majored in dance.

Beauty contests 
One of Huntingdon's first beauty pageant titles was Miss Mount Shasta in 1954–1955.

After winning the Miss California USA crown, Huntingdon went on to become California's first representative to achieve the title of Miss USA. She was the first Miss USA to win the title at a pageant held in her home state.

She was second runner-up in the Miss Universe 1959 pageant.

Acting 
Huntingdon made occasional television and film appearances. In her first television role in 1959 she appeared on Perry Mason as defendant Kitty Wynne in "The Case of the Bartered Bikini." She was a contestant on the television quiz show You Bet Your Life, hosted by Groucho Marx, in 1960. She also appeared as Hecuba in the Three Stooges feature film The Three Stooges Meet Hercules.

Paternity suit 
Huntingdon was involved in a paternity suit in 1963 when attorney Arthur Crowley denied being the father of her daughter, who was then a year old. In 1965, California's 2nd District Court of Appeal reversed the Superior Court's verdict, which went in Crowley's favor, and ordered a new trial. In 1966, the California Supreme Court reversed the verdict in which Crowley was absolved, and it ordered a new trial.

Other activities
After leaving acting, Huntingdon worked in a variety of jobs including being a production manager for a women's clothing business, modeling, working in the office of U.S. Senator Alan Cranston,  and being a photographer for the Office of Economic Opportunity in the early 1970s.

In 1980, she was appointed to the board of Women's National Bank.

Personal life 
On April 19, 1975, Huntingdon married U.S. Senator Joseph Tydings of Maryland, with whom she had a daughter, actress Alexandra Tydings.

Filmography

Published works
"California Girl: Miss USA 1959"

References

External links
Miss USA official website
Miss California official website

1940 births
Living people
Miss Universe 1959 contestants
Miss USA 1950s delegates
Miss USA winners
People from Mount Shasta, California